Asocena is a Filipino dish primarily consisting of dog meat. The term asocena was first used in the 1980s and became popular when a film entitled Azucena, written by Enrique Ramos and directed by Carlitos Siguion-Reyna, was screened in 2000. The dish's name is a compound word, from aso, the Filipino word for "dog" and Spanish word cena, which means "dinner" or "an evening meal", the literal translation being "dog-meal" or "a meal of dog meat". It may also be a play on the Spanish name Azucena, which is also used to describe a variety of fragrant, white rice.

Eating
Asocena is usually consumed as pulutan (Tagalog; snacks or food served while drinking alcoholic beverages; loosely translates to finger food).

Controversy

The killing of dogs as Livestock has been banned in the Philippines since 1998 via Republic Act No. 8485, known as the Animal Welfare Act, with exemptions for dogs killed and eaten as part of indigenous rituals. Nevertheless, the consumption of dog meat still continues in some regions in the Philippines, notably in the Cordillera highlands in northern Luzon where it is traditional, as reflected in occasional coverage in Philippine newspapers.

See also
 Dog meat
 Bosintang
 Taboo food and drink

References

Philippine cuisine
Meat dishes